The Lower Maleri Formation is a sedimentary rock formation found in Andhra Pradesh and Telangana, India. It is the lowermost member of the Pranhita–Godavari Basin. It is of late Carnian to early Norian age (Upper Triassic), and is notable for its fossils of early dinosaurs, including the basal saurischian (possible theropod) Alwalkeria.

Vertebrate fauna 
cf. Angistorhinus and cf. Typothorax have also been recovered from it.

Correlations 
The formation has been correlated with the Molteno Formation (Karoo Basin) and Pebbly Arkose Formation of Africa, the Santa Maria Formation of the Paraná Basin in Brazil, the Ischigualasto Formation of the Ischigualasto-Villa Unión Basin of Argentina and the lowermost Chinle Formation of North America.

See also 
 List of dinosaur-bearing rock formations

References

Bibliography 
  
  
 

Geologic formations of India
Triassic System of Asia
Norian Stage
Carnian Stage
Fossiliferous stratigraphic units of Asia
Paleontology in India
Geology of Andhra Pradesh
Formations